Drilon Musaj (born 11 September 1994) is a Kosovo Albanian professional footballer who last played as a midfielder for Kosovan club Drita.

Club career
Musaj attracted interest from several Albanian Superliga sides including the reigning champions Skënderbeu Korçë, and he went on trial with Laçi during the summer of 2015, where he eventually signed a two-year contract, worth €1,500 per month.

Musaj left the club in July 2017 after two seasons where he collected 66 appearances in all appearances.

On 27 July 2017, Musaj was presented as Drita's newest player after agreeing to personal terms. In the 2017–18 season, he played in 29 league games as Drita won the championship won 20 May 2018 after earning a goalless draw against title challengers Prishtina in the final matchday.

International career
Musaj was one of the founding members of Kosovo U21 side where he was called up in June 2013 for the 2013 Valais Youth Cup held in Switzerland. He appeared as a substitute in Kosovo's first officially recognised fixture versus Ghana, netting in the 73rd minute as the match ended in a 2–2 draw; Kosovo then lost 5–4 on penalty shootouts. He also played in the third-place match against Egypt which finished in an embarrassing 8–0 defeat.

Personal life
Musaj was married in December 2017 to Kaltrina Veseli.

Honours
Drita
Football Superleague of Kosovo: 2017–18

References

External links

1994 births
Living people
Sportspeople from Gjakova
Kosovo Albanians
Association football midfielders
Kosovan footballers
Kosovo under-21 international footballers
KF Trepça'89 players
KF Laçi players
FC Drita players
Football Superleague of Kosovo players
Kategoria Superiore players
Kosovan expatriate footballers
Expatriate footballers in Albania
Kosovan expatriate sportspeople in Albania